Once Upon a Time in Mumbaai is a 2010 Indian Hindi-language gangster film written by Rajat Arora and directed by Milan Luthria. It stars Ajay Devgan, Emraan Hashmi, Kangana Ranaut, Prachi Desai and Randeep Hooda. Produced by Ekta Kapoor under the Balaji Motion Pictures banner, Once Upon A Time in Mumbaai was released on 30 July 2010 to generally positive reviews from critics, and was a box office success. The film is loosely based on the lives of Mumbai underworld gangsters Haji Mastan and Dawood Ibrahim.

Produced on a budget of 350 million, Once Upon a Time in Mumbaai was released on 30 July 2010 and grossed 851.78 million.

Awards and nominations

See also 
 List of Bollywood films of 2010

Notes

References

External links 
 Accolades for Once Upon a Time in Mumbaai at the Internet Movie Database

Lists of accolades by Indian film